Shalimar railway station is one of five intercity railway stations serving Howrah and Kolkata, India. Shalimar station is situated at Shalimar, in Shibpur area of Howrah. It is one of the cleanest, most well-maintained and non-congested railway terminals in the Kolkata Metropolitan Area.

History
The place where now the station is situated was formerly a very small rail station, and served by some diesel loco hauled trains. The present platforms were occupied by some goods lines. Those lines were a part of large Shalimar rail yard.

In 2000, the first plan was conceived to use this area as a bigger rail station. The rapidly growing long-distance passengers were gradually overcrowding the Howrah station. Due to the limitation of space, new platform construction is restricted at Howrah. Although 3 new platforms (17, 22 & 23) were constructed at Howrah during 2006 – 2008, those were not sufficient. Side by side, due to its almost central position in Howrah, Howrah station is too busy for both suburban and long-distance rail traffic. Unlike Sealdah station, Howrah station has fewer suburban trains than long-distance trains. Due to increasing of Eastern Railway trains, many platforms, which were previously built for South Eastern Railway trains, now often occupied by Eastern Railway trains. But many people of Howrah feel that it is much easy to catch a long-distance train from Howrah than Santragachi, particularly in early morning and late night. But due to platform limitation, increasing the number of long-distance trains was not possible from Howrah for South Eastern Railway.

To overcome this problem, South Eastern Railway suggested to Indian Railway officers to construct another bigger rail station at Howrah, mostly for long-distance trains. The many underused tracks of Shalimar yard was the first choice of the authority.

Construction started from 2000. The construction of platforms, station buildings, and car parking area were started. After the completion, other tracks were re-aligned. The tracks around platform were completely electrified for passenger coaches shunting. At first, only one express train started. This train stopped later and then other long-distance trains started. From this time, diesel loco-hauled trains were replaced by EMU trains, which started suburban services.

Facilities
There is a taxi stand and a toto (e-rickshaw) stand outside the station. The nearest tram terminus was formerly Shibpur, but it was closed in 1971. There are small eateries serving snacks on the platform and eateries serving lunch outside the station.

See also
 Howrah station
 Sealdah Station
 Kolkata station
 Kolkata Suburban Railway
 Kolkata Metro
 Trams in Kolkata

References

External links

 Shalimar Train Station

Rail transport in Howrah
Railway junction stations in West Bengal
Kharagpur railway division
Railway stations opened in 2000
Railway stations in Howrah district
Kolkata Suburban Railway stations